Kentucky Route 418 (KY 418) is a  state highway in the U.S. state of Kentucky. The highway connects mostly rural areas of Clark County with Lexington.

Route description

Fayette County
KY 418 begins at an intersection with US 25/US 421 (Old Richmond Road / Richmond Road) in the southeastern part of Lexington, within Fayette County. This intersection is on the southwestern edge of Jacobson Park. It travels to the southeast and passes Athens Golf Center and Edythe J. Hayes Middle School. After an interchange with Interstate 75 (I-75), it passes the Athens Ball Field Complex. It then enters the Athens neighborhood of the city, where it intersects KY 1973 (Cleveland Road). The highway then crosses over Boone Creek, where it leaves Lexington and enters Clark County.

Jacobson Park
Near Route 418 there is a park that has been around for ages named Jacobson Park. This is a 216 acre park located in east Lexington. The park includes a reserve used by the Kentucky American Water Company and Lakeside Golf Course. There are several basketball courts up the hill as you enter deep into the park along with an eight acre dog park to the right of the lake. There are also seven shelters and four volleyball courts.

Prior to the old playground that once stood there since the 1990s, Jacobson Park has built a new one that includes many features. There are new play areas designed for kids under 2 years of age which is a first for any Lexington park. The new park also has several areas connected by paths using compressed rubber. This makes it easier for kids and adults with disabilities to access the playground. The previous wooden structure was not handicap-accessible. The old playground itself was very popular, so $490,000 was needed to fund for this due to that. Now every area in the park can be used by anybody since it is newly restored. All of the old park playgrounds had termites and bug problems while some of the equipment was not safe to use so that is why it has been decided to be redone. The newly redone park had its grand opening on August 2, 2016.

Jacobson Park has some history connected to it, and the dog park there was Lexington's first ever dog park. However in the Spring of 2014, the park was completely removed. New fencing replaced the old fencing chain link and was expanded along with the hill being redone. The dog park is now complete and has 8 acres divided by 2 paddocks. Both paddocks include plenty of shade by the mature trees. A hydrant is available inside the dog park.

Clark County
KY 418 travels through Locust Grove and winds its way to the east. It travels through Hootentown and then curves to the east-southeast. It intersects the southern terminus of KY 3371 (Combs Ferry Road) before curving to the south-southeast. It passes Lower Howard's Creek Nature Preserve and curves to the east-northeast. It crosses over Lower Howard Creek and curves to the southeast. It travels under an overpass that carries KY 627 (Boonesboro Road). It curves to the east-southeast and intersects the northern terminus of KY 1924 (Four Mile Road). At this intersection, the highway turns left, to the north-northwest, and meets its eastern terminus, an intersection with KY 627.

Major intersections

See also

References

0418
Transportation in Lexington, Kentucky
Transportation in Clark County, Kentucky